The Challenge Novotel was a golf tournament on the Challenge Tour. It was played from 1992 to 1994 in France.

Winners

References

External links
Coverage on the Challenge Tour's official site

Former Challenge Tour events
Defunct golf tournaments in France